Chesterfield Central was a railway station serving the town of Chesterfield, Derbyshire, England.

History
The station opened in 1892 and was closed in 1963. It remained open for goods traffic until 11 September, and a private siding continued in use after that.

Compared to nearby Chesterfield Midland, the station was little used. The number of passengers using the station during the week ending 19 August 1961 was 1,829, whereas Midland station was used by 22,285 passengers in the same week, over twelve times as many.

The station was demolished by 1973 to make way for Chesterfield's inner-relief road, much of which was built along the former trackbed of the GCR. This dual-carriageway now forms part of the A61 road. The  tunnel immediately to the south of the station, which ran from Brewery Street to Hollis Lane, remains in place, sealed at its northern end due to the road construction

See also 
Chesterfield was, at one time, served by three railway stations. The other two are:
Chesterfield Midland station (still in use)
Chesterfield Market Place station

References

Sources

External links 
Photographs of Central Station
Site of the former Central Station, on what is now the A61 Inner-Relief road, looking south in 2008, Photo by Nick Catford
The station in 1950 Britain from Above (free login needed to zoom)

 

Buildings and structures demolished in 1973
Disused railway stations in Derbyshire
Buildings and structures in Chesterfield, Derbyshire
Former Great Central Railway stations
Railway stations in Great Britain closed in 1963
Railway stations in Great Britain opened in 1892